Sigríður is one of the most frequently given female names in Iceland.  In 2004, it was ranked third behind Anna and Guðrún.

According to Icelandic custom, people are generally referred to by first and middle names and patronyms are used only if disambiguation is required.

See also
Sigrid

References

Feminine given names
Icelandic feminine given names